Schwendi may refer to:

Places
 Schwendi (Biberach), a municipality in the district of Biberach in the German state of Baden-Württemberg
 Schwendi (Graben), a settlement in the municipality of Graben in the Swiss canton of Bern
 Schwendi (Grindelwald), a settlement in the municipality of Grindelwald in the Swiss canton of Bern
 Schwendi (Habkern), a settlement in the municipality of Habkern in the Swiss canton of Bern

Surname
 Lazarus von Schwendi, Austrian military commander and general in the Imperial Army of the Holy Roman Empire

Other uses
 Laupheim–Schwendi railway, a railway line that connects Laupheim to Schwendi